In harmonic analysis, a field within mathematics, Littlewood–Paley theory is a theoretical framework used to extend certain results about L2 functions to Lp functions for 1 < p < ∞. It is typically used as a substitute for orthogonality arguments which only apply to Lp functions when p = 2. One implementation involves studying a function by decomposing it in terms of functions with localized frequencies, and using the Littlewood–Paley g-function to compare it with its Poisson integral. E. M. Stein later extended the theory to higher dimensions using real variable techniques.

The dyadic decomposition of a function
Littlewood–Paley theory uses a decomposition of a function f into a sum of functions fρ with localized frequencies. There are several ways to construct such a decomposition; a typical method is as follows.

If f(x) is a function on R, and ρ is a measurable set (in the frequency space) with characteristic function , then fρ is defined via its Fourier transform
.
Informally, fρ is the piece of f whose frequencies lie in ρ.

If Δ is a collection of measurable sets which (up to measure 0) are disjoint and have  union on the real line, then a well behaved function f  can be written as a sum of functions fρ for ρ ∈ Δ.

When Δ consists of the sets of the form

 

for k an integer, this gives a so-called "dyadic decomposition" of f : Σρ fρ.

There are many variations of this construction; for example, the characteristic function of a  set used in the definition of fρ can be replaced by a smoother function.

A key estimate of Littlewood–Paley theory is the Littlewood–Paley theorem, which bounds the size of the functions fρ in terms of the size of f. There are many versions of this theorem corresponding to the different ways of decomposing f.  A typical estimate is to bound the Lp norm of (Σρ |fρ|2)1/2 by a multiple  of the Lp norm of f.

In higher dimensions it is possible to generalize this construction by replacing intervals with rectangles with sides parallel to the coordinate axes. Unfortunately these are rather special sets, which limits the applications to higher dimensions.

The Littlewood–Paley g function
The g function is a non-linear operator on Lp(Rn)  that can be used to control the  Lp norm of a function f in terms of its Poisson integral.
The Poisson integral u(x,y) of f is defined for y > 0 by

where the Poisson kernel P on the upper half space 
is given by 

The Littlewood–Paley g function g(f) is defined by 

A basic property of g  is that it approximately preserves norms. More precisely, for 1 < p < ∞, the ratio of the Lp norms of f and g(f) is bounded above and below by fixed positive constants depending on n and p but not on f.

Applications

One early application of Littlewood–Paley theory was the proof that if Sn are the partial sums of the Fourier series of a periodic  Lp function (p > 1) and nj is a sequence satisfying nj+1/nj > q for some fixed q > 1, then the sequence Snj  converges almost everywhere. This was later superseded by the Carleson–Hunt theorem showing that Sn itself converges almost everywhere.

Littlewood–Paley theory can also be used to prove the Marcinkiewicz multiplier theorem.

References

Fourier analysis